VA-215 may refer to:
 Virginia State Route 215
VA-215 (U.S. Navy) (1955–1967)
Second VA-215 (U.S. Navy) (1968–1977)